Henry James Albright (1887–1951) was an American painter, sculptor, and potter active in Albany, New York.

Albright studied with L. Birge Harrison and John F. Carlson. He was a friend of Gustav Stickley, and a member of the Albany Artist Group and the New Haven Paint and Clay Club. His ceramics appeared in the Georg Jensen catalog as Samara Ware.

References 
 Artnet entry
 Rubylane entry
 Live Auctioneers entry

20th-century American painters
1887 births
1951 deaths
Artists from Albany, New York
Sculptors from New York (state)
Date of birth missing
Place of birth missing
Date of death missing
Place of death missing
20th-century American ceramists
American potters